Mont Clare (also Monte Clare, Montclare) is an unincorporated community in Darlington County, South Carolina, United States.

Notable person
Charles W. Bagnal, United States army officer and lawyer, was born in Mont Clare.

Notes

Unincorporated communities in South Carolina
Unincorporated communities in Darlington County, South Carolina